Biserujka is a cave located 6 km northeast of Dobrinj, in the village of Rudine, above Slivanjska Bay, in the island of Krk, Croatia. 

An undistinguished stone house in the middle of a bare karst landscape hides the entrance to a cave 12 m under the surface. Although it is not very long if compared to other caves, only 110 m deep, the Biserujka cave has everything that is characteristic of karst phenomena. It has typical features such as stalactites and stalagmites, and also a gallery or hall, which is suitable for the holding of concerts. However, because of the low temperature, about 13 °C, people cannot stand being there for long periods of time, so only short musical pieces are performed. Since 1998, the cave has been arranged for sightseeing and the hosts can take groups of 25 at a time.

See also
 Adriatic Sea

References

Caves of Croatia
Limestone caves
Landforms of Primorje-Gorski Kotar County
Karst formations of Croatia
Show caves in Croatia
Tourist attractions in Primorje-Gorski Kotar County